Nikola Popović (born 28 October 1973) is a Portuguese/Serbian football coach. Popović is known for a very attacking and attractive style of play based on possession and high pressure. A UEFA Pro licensed coach (Portuguese Football Federation) – the highest UEFA license available, Popović has coached in ten countries, speaks four languages (Portuguese, English, Serbian, Spanish and Italian).

Coaching career

Popović was raised in Lisbon, Portugal where he began his career with CD Olivais e Moscavide in the Segunda Divisão. Following the 2006–07 season, Popović moved to FC Vihren Sandanski in the Bulgarian A Football Group. He returned to Portugal to Segunda Liga side Varzim SC, where he won the Liga Intercalar.

Popović enjoyed a stint as an assistant coach with the Cape Verde national team in 2010, before joining Spanish Segunda Division B side AD Ceuta helping guide the club to the Copa Del Rey Round of 32 – the club’s best ever showing in the tournament falling to eventual runners-up, Barcelona. Later that same season, Popović linked up with Bulgarian side Chernomorets Burgas in the Bulgarian A Football Group, helping the side to a quarterfinal appearance in the Bulgarian Cup.

He then moved to the United Arab Emirates joining Al Dhafra for the 2011–12 season as an assistant to Baltemar Brito – Jose Mourinho’s former assistant coach – helping them win the Vice President Cup. Popović then took charge of Sertanense FC in the Portuguese Second Division – his first head coaching role in 2012–13. He then joined Qatar’s Aspire Academy in 2014, before returning to Portugal and Benfica B in 2015.

In 2016, he went to Swope Park Rangers, USL Championship, and reached 4 consecutive Finals winning 2 Titles.

Nikola was Head Coach of Swope Park Rangers for the 2017 season.

After one season at United Soccer League side Swope Park Rangers as an Marc Dos Santos assistant coach  in 2016, Popović was named as the Head Coach of the side on 21 November 2016. During his first season as Head Coach of Swope Park Rangers, Popović helped the side win the Western Conference Championship and eventually reaching the league final for the second season in a row. The team performed a very attractive style of football based on possession and high pressure (dominated the stats of USL 2017 in Possession and Passing Accuracy).

On 21 December 2017, it was announced that Popović would take over as Head Coach of the Ottawa Fury of the United Soccer League.

In May 2018, he won award of USL Coach Of The Month and reached the Semi-Finals in the Canadian Championship.

Nikola brings his very attractive and effective style of football based on possession and high pressure. In the same season, he managed to have the most successful start of the season in Ottawa Fury FC, achieved most goals scored in history of the Club and Qualified for the USL playoffs for the first time in history of the club in USL. In the Canadian Cup, the Team also reached the Semi-Finals.

Nikola come back to Europe because is invited by Hélder Cristóvão to assist him in DAC1904. Popović worked already with Hélder in Benfica, and now joins him at Dunajská Streda, Slovak Super Liga (Fortuna Liga).

In 2021, Nikola joined Red Star Belgrade as an assistant coach under Coach Dejan Stanković. At the end of the 2021/2022 Season , he achieved with the team the Serbian Super League - Championship, Serbian Cup - Championship and Europa League 1/8 Final.

Popović has also done internships with Inter Milan (2012–13), Portugal Under-21s (2013) and Serbia and Montenegro Under-21s (2006).

Personal 
Popović holds dual Portuguese and Serbian citizenship. He speaks Portuguese, English, Serbian, Spanish and has a good understanding of Italian and French.

Popović is often invited by Portuguese sports and news television channels to comment and analyse national and internationals soccer matches.

Coaching History

Honours

Statistics

Managerial statistics

References

External links
 Popovic Profile on Ottawa Fury website.

1978 births
Living people
Footballers from Belgrade
Serbian football managers
Ottawa Fury FC coaches
Red Star Belgrade non-playing staff
Serbian expatriate football managers
Expatriate soccer managers in Canada
Expatriate football managers in Cape Verde
Expatriate football managers in Portugal
Expatriate football managers in Bulgaria
Expatriate soccer managers in the United States
Expatriate football managers in the United Arab Emirates
Association footballers not categorized by position
Association football players not categorized by nationality